The following is a list of awards and nominations received by American actress Halle Berry.

Major associations

Academy Awards

British Academy Film Awards

Primetime Emmy Awards

Golden Globe Awards

Screen Actors Guild Awards

Other awards and nominations

American Film Institute

Berlin International Film Festival

BET Awards

Black Reel Awards

Blockbuster Entertainment Awards

Chicago Film Critics Association

Golden Raspberry Awards

Kids' Choice Awards

MTV Movie & TV Awards

NAACP Image Awards

National Board of Review

People's Choice Awards

PRISM Awards

Saturn Award

Teen Choice Awards

References

External links
 

Berry, Halle